Hans Blumer (19 June 1928 – 3 March 2021) was a Swiss swimmer. He competed in the men's 100 metre backstroke at the 1948 Summer Olympics.

References

External links
 

1928 births
2021 deaths
Swiss male backstroke swimmers
Olympic swimmers of Switzerland
Swimmers at the 1948 Summer Olympics
Place of birth missing